Detained is a 1924 American silent comedy film starring Stan Laurel. In 2018, the Frisian Film Archive (Fries Film Archief) in Leeuwarden, Netherlands, was able to recover and restore a specific scene deemed lost. In "The Hanging Scene", Stan Laurel gets an extreme extended neck when he accidentally falls head first into the gallows, while trying to escape the prison. In 2017, a Dutch employee (Jurjen Enzing, 1987) found the footage in their archive and after restoration the entire movie including the scene was uploaded to YouTube. The scene was to be shown at the Bristol Slapstick Festival in January 2018.

Plot
Stan is watering big trees with a watering can. An escaped convict beckons him over and swaps clothes the runs off. An armed warden grabs him and takes him to the prison. A group of female visitors arrive but the basket is too wide to fit through the bars. Stan eventually gets the cake from the basket. A fly in the cream disturbs him. He asks the warden to borrow his gun which he gets, but killing the fly destroys the cake.

At wash time the prisoners are released and Stan tries to sneak off. In the washroom he shares a bowl of soapy water with another convict. When Stan sits down the bowl is catapulted over he warden.

Stan wanders into the execution room and sits in the electric chair. A second man falls in the chair and drifts up to heaven after exploding.

Outside Stan narrowly avoids getting hit with a pick by a convict digging a tunnel. The tunnel comes into a room full of explosives. Stan hammers a stick of dynamite into the wall and thy blow a hole into the chief warden's office. The convict and the warden fight. Stan tries to knock out the warden but hits the convict instead. A girl who entered the room tells the warden that Stan saved him.

Stan is released the next day, and he cries as he says goodbye to the head warden and the girl. He walks off with the warden's wallet and watch.

Cast
 Stan Laurel - A convict
 Julie Leonard - The warden's daughter
 Agnes Ayres

See also
 List of American films of 1924

References

External links

1924 films
American silent short films
American black-and-white films
1924 comedy films
1924 short films
Films directed by Joe Rock
Films directed by Scott Pembroke
Silent American comedy films
American comedy short films
1920s American films